Chris Perkin may refer to:

Chris Perkin, Mayor of Faversham, Kent, England
Chris Perkin (writer), who worked with Thom Tuck

See also
Christopher Perkins (disambiguation)